George Sylvester Viereck (December 31, 1884 – March 18, 1962) was a German-American poet, writer, and pro-German propagandist. He would later work on behalf of Nazi Germany.

Biography

Early life
Sylvester's father, Louis Viereck, was born in Berlin in 1851, to the unmarried actress Edwina Viereck. It was rumored that Louis was the son of Kaiser William I, but Louis was acknowledged as a son instead by Louis von Prillwitz, a son of Prince Augustus of Prussia. In 1870, Louis joined the Socialist Party, and was banished from Berlin eight years later under Otto von Bismarck's Anti-Socialist Laws. In 1881 he became editor of a socialist periodical in Munich. In 1884 he was elected to the Reichstag, but in 1886 was imprisoned for attending Socialist Party meetings. He left the Party upon his release from prison.

Sylvester's mother, Laura Viereck, was born in San Francisco to William Viereck, a younger brother of Edwina Viereck. William was an unsuccessful revolutionary who had fled the German States like other Forty-Eighters and operated a German theatre in San Francisco. After William's death in 1865, his wife returned to Germany with their children. In 1881, Laura married her first cousin Louis. At her urging, Louis emigrated to the United States in 1896, and Laura followed with Sylvester some months later. Louis became an American citizen in 1901, but he returned to Germany in 1911.

George Sylvester Viereck was born in Munich on 31 December 1884. Sylvester began writing poetry when he was eleven. His heroes were Jesus Christ, Napoleon Bonaparte, and Oscar Wilde. While still in college, in 1904, George Sylvester Viereck, with the help of literary critic Ludwig Lewisohn, published his first collection of poems. He graduated from the College of the City of New York in 1906. The next year his collection Nineveh and Other Poems (1907) won Viereck national fame. A number were written in the style of the Uranian male love poetry of the time. 
The Saturday Evening Post called Viereck "the most widely-discussed young literary man in the United States today".

Between 1907 and 1912, Viereck turned into a Germanophile. In 1908, he published the best-selling Confessions of a Barbarian. Viereck lectured at the University of Berlin on American poetry in 1911. For his support of Germany and pacifism, Viereck was expelled from several social clubs and fraternal organizations, and had a falling out with a close friend, poet Blanche Shoemaker Wagstaff.

During World War I he edited a German-sponsored weekly magazine, The Fatherland with a claimed circulation of 80,000.
In August 1918, a lynch mob stormed Viereck's house in Mount Vernon, forcing him to seek refuge in a New York City hotel. In 1919, shortly after the Great War, he was expelled from the Poetry Society of America.

International success
In 1923, Viereck published a popular-science book entitled Rejuvenation: How Steinach Makes People Young, which drew the attention of Sigmund Freud, who wrote Viereck asking if he would write a similar book about psychoanalysis. Viereck traveled to Vienna to interview Freud, and then went to Munich to interview Adolf Hitler. During the mid-1920s, Viereck went on several additional tours of Europe, interviewing Marshal Foch, Georges Clemenceau, George Bernard Shaw, Oswald Spengler, Benito Mussolini, Queen Elisabeth of the Belgians, Henry Ford, Albert Moll, Magnus Hirschfeld, and Albert Einstein. Viereck became close friends with Nikola Tesla. Tesla occasionally attended dinner parties held by Viereck and his wife. He dedicated his poem "Fragments of Olympian Gossip" to Viereck, a work in which Tesla ridiculed the scientific establishment of the day.

Support for Hitler
Viereck founded two publications, The International (of which the notorious poet and occultist Aleister Crowley was a contributing editor for a time) and The Fatherland, which argued the German cause during World War I. Viereck became a well-known supporter of Nazism. In 1933, Viereck again met with Hitler, now Germany's leader, in Berlin, and in 1934, he gave a speech to twenty thousand "Friends of the New Germany" at New York's Madison Square Garden, in which he compared Hitler to Franklin D. Roosevelt and told his audience to sympathize with Nazism without being antisemites. His Jewish friends denounced him as "George Swastika Viereck", but he continued to promote Nazism.

In 1940, Viereck launched a scheme in which he "paid members of Congress to take propaganda from the Hitler government — he'd literally get it from the German embassy — and deliver it in Congress in floor speeches. Then he'd use their offices' franking privileges to get thousands, in some cases millions, of reprints of this Nazi propaganda. He would mail it out, at taxpayer expense, all over the United States." The key members of Congress working with Viereck in this scheme were Sen. Ernest Lundeen, Rep. Hamilton Fish, and Rep. Jacob Thorkelson.
 
In 1941, Viereck was indicted in the U.S. for a violation of the Foreign Agents Registration Act when he set up his publishing house, Flanders Hall, in Scotch Plains, New Jersey. In 1942, he was convicted of failing to register with the United States Department of State as a Nazi agent and sentenced to 2 to 6 years in prison. After unsuccessful appeals all the way up to the Supreme Court, he was imprisoned for 5 years on July 31st, 1943. Viereck spent 3 years and 10 months in prison, until May 17th, 1947, when he was discharged on the grounds that he was not compelled to report his activities "except as an agent of a foreign government."

Postwar
Viereck's memoir of life in prison, Men Into Beasts, was published as a paperback original by Fawcett Publications in 1952. The book is a general memoir of discomfort, loss of dignity, and brutality in prison life. The front matter and backcover text focuses on the situational homosexuality and male rape described in the book (witnessed, not experienced, by Viereck).

Family
He had two sons, George and Peter. George was killed in action during the Second World War. His other son, Peter Viereck, was a historian, political writer and poet. A 2005 New Yorker article discusses how the younger Viereck both rejected and was shaped by the ideologies of his father.

Reception
The poem "Slaves" published in the 1924 collection The Three Sphinxes and Other Poems inspired the title of the 1968 psychothriller Twisted Nerve, and is quoted several times in the film:
A twisted nerve, a ganglion gone awry,Predestinates the sinner and the saint.Bibliography
 (1906) A Game at Love, and Other Plays. New York: Brentano's.
 (1907) The House of the Vampire. New York: Moffat, Yard & Company. Audiobook available.
 (1907) Nineveh and Other Poems. New York: Moffat, Yard & Company.
 (1910) Confessions of a Barbarian. New York: Moffat, Yard & Company.
 (1912) The Candle and the Flame. New York: Moffat, Yard & Company.
 (1916) Songs of Armageddon and Other Poems. New York: Mitchell Kennerley.
 (1919) Roosevelt: A Study in Ambivalence. New York: Jackson Press, Inc.
 (1923) Rejuvenation: How Steinach Makes People Young. New York: Thomas Seltzer [as George F. Corners].
 (1924) The Three Sphinxes and Other Poems. Girard, Kansas: Haldeman-Julius Company. 
 (1928) My First Two Thousand Years: The Autobiography of the Wandering Jew. New York: The Macaulay Company [with Paul Eldridge]. 
 (1930) Glimpses of the Great. New York: The Macaulay Company.
 (1930) Salome: The Wandering Jewess. My First 2,000 Years of Love. New York, Liveright.
 (1930) Spreading Germs of Hate. New York: Liveright [with a foreword by Colonel Edward M. House].
 (1931) My Flesh and Blood. A Lyric Autobiography, with Indiscreet Annotations. New York: Liveright.
 (1932) The Invincible Adam. London: Gerald Duckworth & Co. [with Paul Eldridge]. 
 (1932) The Strangest Friendship: Woodrow Wilson and Colonel House. New York: Liveright.
 (1937) The Kaiser on Trial. New York: The Greystone Press.
 (1938) Before America Decides. Foresight in Foreign Affairs. Cambridge, Mass.: Harvard University Press [with  Frank P. Davidson].
 (1941) The Seven Against Man. Flanders Hall.
 (1949) All Things Human. New York: Sheridan House [as Stuart Benton].
 (1952) Men into Beasts. Fawcett Publications.
 (1952) Gloria: A Novel. London: Gerald Duckworth & Co; republished as The Nude in the Mirror (1953). New York: Woodford Press.

Articles
 (1910) "Some Reminiscences of Richard Watson Gilder", The Forum 43, pp. 73–78.
 (1922) "Would-Be Assassins", The American Monthly 14 (1), pp. 5–6.
 (1929) "At the Threshold of the Invisible", Ghost Stories 6 (1).
 (1929) "Spirits in the Laboratory", Ghost Stories 6 (5).

Miscellany
 (1907) America: A Litany of Nations. Edited by George Sylvester Viereck. New York: The  New Immigrants' Protective League.
 (1913) The Works of George Sylvester Viereck. New York: Moffat, Yard & Company [5 vols.]
 (1915) Debate between George Sylvester Viereck and Cecil Chesterton. New York: The Fatherland Corporation.
 (1925) The Harlot’s House and Other Poems. Edited, with an introduction, by George Sylvester Viereck. Girard, Kansas: Haldeman-Julius Company.
 (1929) As They Saw Us: Foch, Ludendorff and Other Leaders Write Our War History. Edited by George Sylvester Viereck. Garden City, N.Y.: Doubleday, Doran & Company.

Foreign editions
 (1906) Niniveh und Andere Gedichte, German translation of Niviveh and Other Poems. Stuttgart, Berlin: J.G. Cota.
 (1909) Das Haus des Vampyrs, German translation of The House of the Vampire. Der Kentaur Verlag.
 (2003) La Maison du Vampire, French translation of The House of the Vampire. La Clef d'Argent.

References

Further reading
 Antinori, John V. (1991). "Androcles and the Lion Hunter: G.B.S., George Sylvester Viereck, and the Politics of Personality", SHAW: The Annual of Bernard Shaw Studies, Vol. 11, Shaw and Politics, pp. 149–168.
 Jones, John Price (1918). "The Public Mind", in The German Secret Service in America, 1914–1918. Boston: Small, Maynard & Company, pp. 225–251.
 Sullivan, Mark (1936). "German Plotting Exposed", in Our Times, 1900–1925. New York: Charles Scribner's Sons, pp. 184–196.

External links

 
 
 
 Works by George Sylvester Viereck at JSTOR
 Works by George Sylvester Viereck at Hathi Trust
 What Life Means to Einstein, an Interview by George Sylvester Viereck
 Viereck, George Sylvester, 1884–1962
 The Fatherland
 
 
 George Sylvester Viereck mentioned in Episode 4 and Episode 7 of Rachel Maddow's Ultra'' podcast (2022)

1884 births
1962 deaths
20th-century American poets
American magazine editors
American political writers
German emigrants to the United States
American male poets
20th-century American male writers
20th-century American non-fiction writers
American prisoners and detainees
American male non-fiction writers
American collaborators with Nazi Germany
Nazi propagandists
Activists from New York City
Prisoners and detainees of the United States federal government